

Plants

Conifers

Flowering plants

Arthropods

Insects

Sauropterygians

New taxa

Vertebrates

Expeditions, field work, and fossil discoveries
 Charles Gilmore returned to prospect for fossils in the Two Medicine Formation.

Institutions and organizations
 The Calgary Public Museum of Alberta, Canada closed due to financial problems triggered by the Great Depression. By this point the museum had accumulated roughly 7500 different items of both natural and man-made origin. The collections were stored in another Calgary building called the Coste House.

References

1930s in paleontology
Paleontology 5